Gabriel del Valle Medina (born 3 December 1970) is an Argentine football manager and former player who played as a defender. He is the current manager of Ecuadorian club Deportivo Cuenca along with Juan Zubeldía.

Playing career
Born in Buenos Aires, del Valle began his career with hometown side River Plate, making his senior debut in 1991. He moved to fellow Primera División side Lanús in the following years, but only remained one season at his new side, after featuring rarely.

From 1994 onwards, del Valle played for Primera B Nacional sides Sarmiento, Nueva Chicago, Deportivo Morón, Cipolletti and Gimnasia y Tiro, before moving abroad for the 2001 season, with Ecuadorian side LDU Quito. He helped the latter bounce back to the Serie A in 2001 as a starter, before featuring more sparingly in 2002 and subsequently signing for Técnico Universitario.

In 2003, del Valle returned to his home country and joined Aldosivi in the Torneo Federal A. He then played for Primera B Metropolitana side Temperley in 2005, before again moving abroad in the following year with Oriente Petrolero; he retired with the latter in 2007, aged 36.

Managerial career
After retiring, del Valle returned to his former side Lanús and worked as a manager in the youth categories. In 2016, he was also an assistant of Ariel Paolorossi in the Argentina national under-20 team during the 2016 COTIF Tournament.

In 2019, del Valle joined Gabriel Schürrer's staff at Ecuadorian club Aucas, as his assistant. He followed Schürrer to Blooming, Mitre (SdE) and Deportivo Cuenca under the same role, before being named manager of the latter on 12 December 2022, with Juan Zubeldía.

References

External links

1970 births
Living people
Footballers from Buenos Aires
Argentine footballers
Association football defenders
Argentine Primera División players
Club Atlético River Plate footballers
Club Atlético Lanús footballers
Club Atlético Sarmiento footballers
Nueva Chicago footballers
Deportivo Morón footballers
Club Cipolletti footballers
Gimnasia y Tiro footballers
L.D.U. Quito footballers
C.D. Técnico Universitario footballers
Aldosivi footballers
Club Atlético Temperley footballers
Oriente Petrolero players
Argentine expatriate footballers
Argentine expatriate sportspeople in Ecuador
Argentine expatriate sportspeople in Bolivia
Expatriate footballers in Ecuador
Expatriate footballers in Bolivia
Argentine football managers
C.D. Cuenca managers
Argentine expatriate football managers
Expatriate football managers in Ecuador